Michael Finneran (born 10 September 1947) is a former Irish Fianna Fáil politician. He was a Teachta Dála (TD) for the Roscommon–South Leitrim constituency from 2007 to 2011, and also served as a Minister of State.

A former psychiatric nurse, Finneran was first elected to Dáil Éireann at the 2002 general election for the Longford–Roscommon constituency. He was previously a member of Seanad Éireann from 1989 to 2002.

On 13 May 2008, shortly after Brian Cowen became Taoiseach, he was appointed as Minister of State at the Department of the Environment, Community and Local Government with special responsibility for Housing, Urban Renewal and Developing Areas. His area of responsibility was changed to Housing and Local Services in 2009.

He retired from politics at the 2011 general election.

References

	

1947 births
Living people
Fianna Fáil senators
Fianna Fáil TDs
Irish sportsperson-politicians
Local councillors in County Roscommon
Members of the 19th Seanad
Members of the 20th Seanad
Members of the 21st Seanad
Members of the 29th Dáil
Members of the 30th Dáil
Ministers of State of the 30th Dáil
Politicians from County Roscommon
Roscommon inter-county Gaelic footballers